Dendrilla is a genus of sponges belonging to the family Darwinellidae.

The species of this genus are found in Southern Hemisphere and Southern Europe.

Species:

Dendrilla acantha 
Dendrilla antarctica 
Dendrilla cactos 
Dendrilla cactus
Dendrilla camera 
Dendrilla cavenosa
Dendrilla cirroides
Dendrilla cirsioides 
Dendrilla cruor 
Dendrilla lacunosa 
Dendrilla lendenfeldi 
Dendrilla membranosa 
Dendrilla mertoni 
Dendrilla praetensa
Dendrilla rosea

References

Darwinellidae
Sponge genera